Zimmern unter der Burg is a town in the Zollernalbkreis district, in Baden-Württemberg, Germany.

History
Before 1806, Zimmern unter der Burg was a possession of the County of Waldburg-Zeil, but after that date was mediatized to the Kingdom of Württemberg. A patrimonial vogtei based in Balgheim was present in the township until 1833, when its rights expired and the manor was sold to the Oberamt. There was not much development in the municipality after World War II.

Geography
The municipality (Gemeinde) of Zimmern unter der Burg is found at the southwestern edge of the Zollernalb district of Baden-Württemberg, a state of the Federal Republic of Germany. It lies along the border of the district of Rottweil. The town of Zimmern unter der Burg itself lies on the confluence of three streams. Elevation above sea level in the municipal area ranges from a high of  Normalnull (NN) to a low of  NN.

A portion of the Federally-protected  nature reserve is located in Zimmern's municipal area.

Coat of arms
Zimmern's coat of arms is divided by a zig-zag line into two fields: an upper, white half and a lower, red half. A corresponding municipal flag was issued by the Zollernalb district office on 29 March 1982.

Transportation

References

External links
  (in German)

Towns in Baden-Württemberg